A by-election was held for the New South Wales Legislative Assembly electorate of Northumberland on 20 June 1899 because of the death of Richard Stevenson.

Dates

Result

Richard Stevenson died.

See also
Electoral results for the district of Northumberland
List of New South Wales state by-elections

References

1899 elections in Australia
New South Wales state by-elections
1890s in New South Wales